Springfield–Branson National Airport  (formerly Springfield–Greene County Airport, Springfield Municipal Airport, and Springfield–Branson Regional Airport) is  northwest of Springfield, Missouri, in Greene County, United States. The airport has non-stop flights to fifteen U.S. cities.

History
The airport opened as the Springfield–Greene County Airport on July 2, 1945, following bond issues of $350,000 in 1942 and $150,000 in 1945 to build the airport. It replaced the Springfield Park and Airport on East Division Street (which now operates as Downtown Airport). Springfield Park was the former McCluer Flying Field, which opened in 1925 and was purchased by the city in 1928; it had scheduled service by American Airlines and Transcontinental and Western. The airlines pulled out in the Great Depression.

The airport was renamed the Springfield Municipal Airport after the city and the county disagreed on funding.

American Airlines began scheduled flights to the new airport in 1945–46; it pulled out in 1963. Chicago and Southern arrived in 1948 and Ozark in 1951; the first scheduled jets were Ozark DC-9s in 1966. A new terminal opened in October 1964, paid for by a 1960 $600,000 bond issue.

In that same year, the community of Lakeview, renamed itself Branson West." Branson has not said anything formal about the airport's running.

In May 2006, ground was broken for a new terminal and it was announced the airport would be renamed Springfield–Branson National Airport. The new Midfield Terminal opened on May 6, 2009, designed by Reynolds, Smith & Hills.

The airport hit one million passengers for the first time in 2018.

Accidents and incidents
At 10:36 pm on March 20, 1955, American Airlines Flight 711 crashed more than a mile north of the airport. Eleven of 32 passengers died, along with the stewardess and copilot. The federal investigation blamed pilot error misjudging the altitude. It is the only airline crash at the airport.

Facilities

In the year ending December 31, 2021 the airport had 47,565 aircraft operations, average 130 per day: 44% general aviation, 27% air taxi, 6% military and 22% airline. 142 aircraft at that time were based at this airport: 87 single-engine, 10 multi-engine, 33 jet, 2 helicopters, and 10 military.

An Army National Guard unit is based at Springfield–Branson, the 35th combat aviation brigade, detachment 3 company 1 of the 185th aviation regiment. "The 35th Combat Aviation Brigade deploys to an area of responsibility to provide command, control, staff planning and supervision of combat aviation brigade operations. The brigade's units fly a combination of AH-64A Apache attack helicopters, OH-58 Kiowa observation helicopters and UH-60 Blackhawk utility helicopters. It also has a detachment of two C-23 Sherpa cargo airplanes and a C-12 transport airplane."

Financial data
The strongest area of income for SGF is from non-aeronautical revenue activities including parking and rental cars. This is followed by fuel sales, terminal fees and landing fees. Parking income has been the strongest for the past year and has followed enplanement trends with a drop in revenues in FY 2008, and increasing again in FY 2010, with the highest level to date at more than $2.5 million.

Personnel is the largest expenditure for the airport: this major operating expense is increasing per year and remains the highest by a very large margin. Additionally, an expense that sticks out is a sharp increase in contractual series between FY 2011 and FY 2012.

Source:

Airlines and destinations

Passenger

Cargo

Statistics

Top destinations

Annual traffic

References

External links
 Springfield–Branson National Airport – official site

Airports in Missouri
Transportation in Springfield, Missouri
Buildings and structures in Springfield, Missouri
Airports established in 1945
1945 establishments in Missouri